Odd Fellows' Home for Orphans, Indigent and Aged, also known as I.O.O.F. Home for the Aged, in Springfield, Ohio, was built in 1898.  Its architecture is Renaissance and Chateauesque.  It was listed on the National Register of Historic Places in 1980.

It was designed by Joseph W. Yost and Frank Packard's firm of Yost & Packard. The building has two octagonal spires.

References

Residential buildings on the National Register of Historic Places in Ohio
Renaissance Revival architecture in Ohio
Residential buildings completed in 1898
Buildings and structures in Springfield, Ohio
National Register of Historic Places in Clark County, Ohio
Odd Fellows buildings in Ohio
Yost and Packard buildings